Gian Luca Rossi (Milan, September 17, 1966) is an Italian sports journalist and TV presenter.

Career
Graduated in Law with a thesis on the sport accidents in Roman law and modern, he became a journalist in 1988 and became professional in 1995.
He began working in 1986 as a commentator on Radio Peter Flowers, and in 1988 he moved to Telelombardia to do the official commentator of the matches of Inter in the transmission Qui studio a voi stadio, commenting live the victory of the 1989 Scudetto won by Giovanni Trapattoni as coach.
He has worked with newspapers Tuttosport, Il Giorno, the monthly Milan-Inter derby and, since 2004, following F.C. Inter also on Antenna 3.

References

1966 births
Italian sports journalists
Italian male journalists
Mass media people from Milan
Living people